is a Japanese animation studio established on July 3, 2015.

Works

Anime television series

Original video animation

Original net animation

References

External links

 

 
Animation studios in Tokyo
Japanese companies established in 2015
Japanese animation studios
Mass media companies established in 2015
Suginami